Lamoria hemi is a species of snout moth in the genus Lamoria. It was described by Rose in 1981. It is found in India.

References

Moths described in 1981
Tirathabini